Muse on Music is the first instrumental compilation album by South Korean girl group Lovelyz. The album was released on September 11, 2018 by Woollim Entertainment and distributed by Kakao M. The album contains 33 tracks, from 8 previous albums.

Background and release
Lovelyz released their first compilation album Muse on Music on September 11. The album contains the instrumental version of 33 tracks selected from their eight released records. It is also the first time a K-pop girl group released such album.

Track listing

Charts

References

2018 albums
Lovelyz albums